Hannah Mary Beazley (born 8 July 1979) is an Australian politician. She has been a Labor member of the Western Australian Legislative Assembly since the 2021 state election, representing  Victoria Park.

Early life and family
Beazley is the daughter of Kim Beazley and the granddaughter of Kim Beazley Sr. and Shane Paltridge, all of whom were senior figures in Australian federal politics. Her mother is Mary Ciccarelli.

Political career
Beazley first contested in the 2013 state election in the electorate of Riverton but was unsuccessful. She then ran in the 2019 federal election in her father's former seat of Swan. She achieved a minor swing but ultimately lost to incumbent Steve Irons.

In March 2020, following Treasurer Ben Wyatt's announcement that he would retire from parliament at the next election, Beazley was preselected for his seat of Victoria Park. However, later that month,  Wyatt reversed his decision to quit and announced he would stay on to assist the McGowan government in the state's economic recovery from the COVID-19 crisis. Beazley then stood aside from the seat and was subsequently selected to contest in the South West region of the Western Australian Legislative Council. In November 2020, Wyatt announced his intention to retire for the second time and Beazley was once again selected to be the candidate for Victoria Park. She was elected with an increased margin in the 2021 state election. In her election campaigns, Beazley received support through EMILY's List Australia.

In December 2022, she became a parliamentary secretary to Stephen Dawson, the minister for emergency services, innovation and the digital economy, medical research, and volunteering.

References

External links 

 

Living people
1979 births 
Australian Labor Party members of the Parliament of Western Australia
Members of the Western Australian Legislative Assembly
Women members of the Western Australian Legislative Assembly
21st-century Australian politicians
21st-century Australian women politicians